Szigetvár is a district in western part of Baranya County, Hungary. Szigetvár is also the name of the town where the district seat is found. The district is located in the Southern Transdanubia Statistical Region.

Geography 
Szigetvár District borders with Kaposvár District (Somogy County) to the north, Hegyhát District and Szentlőrinc District to the east, Sellye District to the south, Barcs District (Somogy County) to the west. The number of the inhabited places in Szigetvár District is 45.

Municipalities 
The district has 1 town and 44 villages.
(ordered by population, as of 1 January 2012)

The bolded municipality is city.

See also
List of cities and towns in Hungary

References

External links
 Postal codes of the Szigetvár District

Districts in Baranya County